Scott Wight (born 5 November 1985) is a Scottish rugby union player. His regular playing position is stand-off. He played for Glasgow Warriors in the PRO12 having previously represented Melrose.

Club career
Scott started off playing for Melrose RFC playing at 10. During his time at Melrose, Wight captained the Greenyards team to a magnificent haul of Premier 1, Border League and Melrose Sevens titles, and also guided them to the final of the Scottish Cup. He also represented the Scotland Club XV International team.

In 2011, Scott signed with Glasgow Warriors. Since his time there, he has been the third choice stand off behind internationalists Duncan Weir and Ruaridh Jackson. During the 2012 season, he has been a strong contender with Jackson to start with Weir being injured. In May 2013, Wight signed a new one-year contract, saying  "I've only ever wanted to stay in Glasgow and I'm very happy to have signed this new deal".

Wight left Glasgow at the end of the 2013–14 season.

He joined the Warriors side again on 25 August 2015, this time on loan from Scotland 7s. This was to provide cover at fly-half throughout the Rugby World Cup period with the injury to Gregor Hunter.

Coaching
While still an active player, Wight took a step into coaching in April 2017 when he was appointed as coach of the Scotland Women 7s squad, replacing Scott Forrest in the role.

Reference List

External links 
 itsrugby.co.uk profile

1985 births
Living people
Rugby union fly-halves
Scottish rugby union players
Glasgow Warriors players
Scotland international rugby sevens players
Male rugby sevens players
Women's rugby union in Scotland
Scotland Club XV international rugby union players